The General Staff Building (Zdanie General'nogo shtaba) is the headquarters of the General Staff of the Russian Armed Forces, situated on Arbatskaya Square in Central Administrative Okrug of Moscow, Russia. 

The building was designed by Mikhail Posokhin who was the main architect of Moscow (1960–1982), and built in 1979–1987.

History
To clear the place for the building, the buildings on Znamenka, Vozdvizhenka, and Arbatskaya Square were demolished. In particular, the house where Nikolai Rubinstein and Pyotr Tchaikovsky lived in their youth was destroyed, as well as the hotel where Sergei Rachmaninoff lived.

In the courtyard of the building is the ground lobby of the Moscow Metro station Arbatskaya of the Arbatsko-Pokrovskaya line. During the construction of the building, new exits from the lobby through the building were arranged towards Vozdvizhenka, and the old ones, to Arbatskaya Square, were closed.

Architecture
The General Staff building occupies an entire quarter. One of its facades faces Arbatskaya Square. The building has eight floors. The walls are decorated with marble, Ural stone – a coil and granite. Facades have horizontal and vertical division. The architectural style as a whole is characteristic of the Soviet administrative buildings of the 1960s–1970s, but at the same time, there are certain features postmodernism in the design of the portals and in the drawing of the crowning part of the structure.

References

External links
 
 General Staff Building @ moskvasovet.ucoz.com

Buildings and structures in Moscow
Arbat District
Central Administrative Okrug
Buildings and structures completed in 1987
Russia
Military installations of Russia